Dare to be Digital is a video games design competition targeted at university students and recent graduates, started by and held at Abertay University, Scotland since 2000.

Teams (typically of 5 university undergraduates or fresh graduates) work together in a microcosm of a games development company at their home or within their home university to develop a prototype of a new video game. Teams have 9 weeks from the start of the competition to finish their game although it can be in production for up to a year prior to starting.

The main objective is to help students gain real life working experience as a multi-disciplinary group. Mentoring support is provided by game industry professionals. The competition culminates at Dare Protoplay, an indie games festival in which the games made by Dare Contestants are the main event and can be voted on by the public. Entrants are provided free accommodation for the duration of Dare Protoplay by Abertay University.

Entrance to the competition is based upon each team's ability and the nature of the game concept. This is measured against three criteria: creativity, market potential, and use of technology. Applications for Dare to be Digital are assessed by members of Dare to be Digital's "Developer Accord", consisting entirely of representatives from the games industry. These representatives will also interview the teams before making a decision on which teams will take part that year.

These criteria are also used to decide the three winning teams, who go through to be nominated for the BAFTA Ones To Watch Award. Additional awards are given by sponsors, such as Channel 4, Design in Action and Intel, as well as an audience and team choice awards based on public and team votes respectively.

BAFTA Ones To Watch Award 

The three winning teams of Dare to be Digital form the sole nominees of a BAFTA Ones To Watch Award as of 2007. 

There was no BAFTA Video Games Awards Ceremony in 2008. The nominees for the 2016 BAFTA Ones to Watch award will include:
 Pixel Tailors (University of the Arts London) for 'The Wall Shall Stand'
 Mild Beast Games (University of Southern California and Berklee College of Music) for 'Sundown'
 Pictrail (Glasgow Caledonian University) for Selfienation

Dare ProtoPlay 
Building on the final phase of Dare to be Digital, Dare ProtoPlay, a video game and consumer event, takes place over 3 days in August every year. After the competition ends the teams demonstrate their titles at Dare ProtoPlay, formerly held at the Edinburgh Interactive Festival until 2010 but now at the Caird Hall in Dundee. This free event is open to the general public.

13,000 visitors visited Dare ProtoPlay 2013. Dare 2014 was held on 7–10 August in Dundee City Square and Caird Hall.

History 
In 1999, an idea was developed within the University of Abertay Dundee, who were one of the global pioneers in academic courses for video games development. In 2000, it was opened to all university students across Scotland.

Different development models were tested with involvement from international teams who came from Japan, Canada, China, India and Malaysia, where a trial host centre model was carried out.

With industry and government support, the contest opened parallel host centres across the UK as of 2007, in Belfast and Electronic Arts office in Guildford.  It has since been opened up to all UK and Irish universities and selected international partners, with all teams now being hosted in the University of Abertay Dundee.

Awards and recognitions 
2014 
Winner of Develop Talent Investment Award 

2011
Livingstone-Hope Review of Video Games and Visual Effects Next Gen. (2011)
Dare to be Digital was singled out and cited in one of the 20 recommendations as a template for the UK education:
Develop a template for introducing workshop simulation into industry-accredited video games and visual effects courses, based on Abertay University’s Dare to be Digital competition.

2009
Demanding Growth: Why the UK needs a recovery plan based on growth and innovation (2009) & 
Demanding Growth in Scotland: Why Scotland needs a recovery plan based on growth and innovation (2009)
Rolling out of student placements such as the highly successful Dare to be Digital prototype competition across the UK. This initiative, sponsored by the University of Abertay in Dundee, provides talented students with the opportunity to showcase their creativity and skills in front of prospective employers. Wider use of placements encourages HEIs to simulate the workplace environment more successfully.

2008
Winner of Develop Edu New Talent Award

2007
Playing for Keeps – challenges to sustaining a world-class UK games sector (2007)
The exception to the rule is Abertay University’s Dare to be Digital competition (DTBD), which funds teams of students to develop prototype game engines and playable levels of games in a ten-week intensive course. The resulting games are then judged by a panel of industry specialists and small cash prizes are given based on a range of awards from ‘most commercially viable’ to ‘best use of technology’. The resulting games, their excellence and their creator’s employability have shown the industry the creativity and ingenuity of the new talent emerging from the handful of UK universities so far involved. 25 out of 46 current courses have contributed entrants to date, and 80 per cent of Dare’s participants win jobs in the industry after competing.

Support 
Scottish Enterprise Tayside and Dundee City Council have been supporters of the development of the competition since its beginning, along with local technology company NCR Corporation and game developers such as Rare, Blitz Games Studios, Electronic Arts and Rockstar North.

Dare 2007 
12 teams took part in Dare 2007, including BAFTA Ones to Watch Award nominees Care Box for their game 'Climbactic' (Edinburgh University), Phoenix Seed for 'Bear Go Home' (Peking University and the University of Abertay Dundee) and Voodoo Boogy for 'Ragnarawk' who ultimately won the BAFTA Ones to Watch Award.

Dare 2008 
There were 17 teams taking part in Dare 2008, including BAFTA Ones to Watch Award nominees Blue Skies for their game ‘Origamee’ (Abertay University), Ctrl_D for ‘VegeMe’(Peking University) and DarkMatter Designs for ‘Boro-Toro’, with the latter team winning.

Dare 2009 
14 teams took part in 2009. The competition went more international with students coming from Canada, England, India, China, Northern Ireland, The Irish Republic, Norway, Scotland and Wales. The BAFTA Ones to Watch Award nominees were Colour-coded by PixelPirates (University of Abertay Dundee), Quick as Thieves by Gentlemen of Fortune (University of Abertay Dundee) and Shrunk by The Butterflyers (University of Abertay Dundee) who won the award.

Dare 2010 
15 teams took part in 2010, coming from China, England, India, Ireland, Sweden, Scotland, USA and Wales. The three BAFTA Ones to Watch Award nominees were Angry Mango for their game 'Mush' (University of Wales, Newport), Team Tickle for 'Sculpty' (Abertay University) and That Game Studio for 'Twang', who ultimately won the award.

Awards
Prize winners were 'Bears with Jetpacks' for their game 'Grrr!' who won the "Adult Swim" sponsored award for innovation and creativity.

The Teams-Choice award went to Bazooka Duck, who also won the Intel Visual Adrenaline Award, and That Games Studio won the public choice award.

Media coverage 
Dare 2010 was the focus of a 3 part documentary series filmed for, and screened by Channel 4 in the UK. Named 'Crunchtime' the series featured several teams during the development of their games and the Protoplay exhibition.

Dare 2011 
Dare 2011 had 15 participating teams from England, Scotland, Wales, Ireland, Northern Ireland, India, Denmark and China.

Dare 2012 

Dare 2012 had 15 participating teams from England, Scotland, Ireland, India, Finland, Israel, Spain and China.

Awards 2012

BAFTA "Ones to Watch Award" Nominations
- Starcrossed, for Windows Phone 7 by Kind of a Big Deal

- Pixel Story, for PC by Loan Wolf Games

- Project Thanatos, for PC and virtual reality headset by Raptor Games

Channel 4 prize
Loan Wolf Games

Intel Visual Computing Tools Audience Award
Raptor Games

Developers Choice Award
Team-Iso

Dare 2014 
Dare 2014 had 15 participating teams from Scotland, England, Ireland, USA, China, India and Malta.

Awards 2014

BAFTA "Ones to Watch Award" Nominations

- Chambara, for PC by Overly Kinetic

- Don't Walk: Run, for PC and Tablet by Torque

- Sagittarius, for PC and Oculus Rift by Too Mainstream

Channel 4 prize
Don't Walk: RUN by Torque

The Foundry Artistic Achievement Award
Seek by Five Pixels

Dare Team's Choice Award
D-Bug by The Pillowettes

Dare Protoplay Audience Award
World Eater by Taleforge

Dare Commercial Potential Award
Baum by A Fox Wot I Drew

References

External links
 Dare to be Digital
 Dare ProtoPlay
 2008 BAFTA Ones To Watch Winner announced
 2007 BAFTA Ones To Watch Winner announced

Competitions in Scotland